Island of Death (Greek: Τα Παιδιά Του Διαβόλου, Ta pediá tou Diavólou), also known as Devils in Mykonos and A Craving For Lust, is a 1976 Greek exploitation film directed by Nico Mastorakis. It tells the story of a man and a woman, posing as newlyweds, who visit the Greek island of Mykonos and start a rampage of murder, killing anyone they believe to be sinful or perverted.

The film was initially banned as a video nasty, and is one of the most widely banned films in the world. It remained banned for several years in the United Kingdom until a heavily censored (missing over four minutes) version was released by Vipco. It was first released uncut in 2003 by Image Entertainment and then it was released uncut by Arrow Films in 2011.

Plot
Christopher and Celia rent a home on the Greek island of Mykonos for their purported honeymoon. The locals believe them to be a normal newlywed couple; however, Christopher and Celia are in fact sexual sadists and murderers, and have left London in order to venture on a killing spree abroad.

The morning after their arrival, Christopher, aroused, rapes a goat and then kills it. The two then meet a French painter who is attracted to Celia. The two nail him to the ground in a crucifixion pose and pour paint down his throat until he chokes to death. They then dump his body in the ocean. While getting acquainted with the island locals, the couple meets Patricia, a wealthy older woman, and are invited to a gay wedding between a middle-aged American on the island and his Greek lover. Christopher and Celia break into the couple's house on their wedding night. Christopher chases the elderly man into the streets before stabbing him to death; Celia shoots his lover in the head with a pistol and stages it as a murder-suicide.

After this, the couple kills Foster, an American police officer who had been trailing them, by hanging him from his plane and flying it over the ocean. Celia begins to resist Christopher's murderous escapades and hesitates when he targets Patricia. He arrives at her house, and the two begin to have sex while Celia watches from a window. Christopher urinates on her and beats her unconscious before taking her body outside and decapitating her with a bulldozer. The next day, while Christopher goes fishing, two hippies attempt to rape Celia while she is taking a bath. However, Christopher returns home to discover them in the act leading him to murder one with a speargun and drown the other in the toilet.

Christopher decides to target a local lesbian bartender, Leslie, who is romantically interested in Celia. Celia visits her house, and Leslie invites her to do heroin; Christopher then enters and knocks her unconscious before injecting her with a lethal dosage. After she dies, he uses an aerosol spray and a candle to burn her face.

Celia begins to dream of a mysterious man and worries that the small size of the island will lead to police suspecting her and Christopher in the string of deaths. When a local crime writer finds Leslie's body, the police begin to search for Christopher and Celia. They flee to a remote farm on the island to hide, and meet a mute shepherd who turns out to be the man whom Celia has been having premonitions of. It is then revealed that Christopher and Celia are in fact brother and sister and have been engaged in an incestuous relationship. The next morning, the shepherd rapes Celia in the barn and then knocks Christopher unconscious before anally raping him. He then throws Christopher into a lye pit, and Celia becomes attached to the stranger. A rainstorm arrives on the island, and Christopher dies in the lye pit while Celia and the shepherd engage in sex.

Cast
 Robert Behling as Christopher (credited as Bob Belling)
 Jane Lyle as Celia (credited as Jane Ryall)
 Jessica Dublin as Patricia
 Gerard Gonalons as Foster
 Jannice McConnell as Leslie (credited as Janice McConnel)
 Nikos Tsachiridis as Shepherd
 Ray Richardson (credited as Ray Zuk)
 Marios Tartas (credited as Mario Tatras)
 Efi Bani (credited as Efi Banny)
 Clay Half (credited as Clay Huff)

Critical reception 
Allmovie gave the film a mixed review, writing "this graphic Grecian proto-slasher is one of the most perverse exploitation films released to the public, a laundry list of outrages that will cause the viewer to wonder what kind of mind could conceive such a monstrosity."

References

External links 
 
 
 

1976 films
1970s exploitation films
1976 horror films
1970s slasher films
English-language Greek films
1970s serial killer films
Greek horror films
Incest in film
LGBT-related horror films
Zoophilia in culture
Films about animal cruelty
Films about rape
Homophobia in fiction
Films about violence against LGBT people
Video nasties
1976 LGBT-related films
Splatter films
Films directed by Nico Mastorakis
1970s English-language films